Brickellia paniculata is a Mesoamerican species of flowering plant in the family Asteraceae. It is widespread from Tamaulipas west to Sinaloa and south as far as Costa Rica.

References

External links
Color photo of herbarium specimen

paniculata
Flora of Mexico
Flora of Central America
Plants described in 1768